Ulakanthura is a genus of isopod crustaceans within the family Leptanthuridae, containing 7 species.

Species 

 Ulakanthura colac 
 Ulakanthura cooma 
 Ulakanthura crassicornis 
 Ulakanthura lara 
 Ulakanthura marlee 
 Ulakanthura namoo 
 Ulakanthura wanda

References 

Isopod genera
Cymothoida